Coumachlor is a first generation anticoagulant rodenticide which blocks formation of prothrombin and inhibits blood coagulation causing death by internal haemorrhage. The chemical can be absorbed through the skin. The symptoms of human contact can be nosebleeds, bleeding gums, bloody urine, extensive bruising in the absence of injury, fatigue, shortness of breath (dyspnea) on exertion. The human consumption or inhalation of compound can also cause fluid in lungs (pulmonary edema).

References

Anticoagulant rodenticides